The 2021–22 season was the 118th season in the existence of K.V. Mechelen and the club's third consecutive season in the top flight of Belgian football. In addition to the domestic league, Mechelen participated in this season's edition of the Belgian Cup.

Players

First-team squad

Other players under contract

Out on loan

Transfers

In

Pre-season and friendlies

Competitions

Overall record

First Division A

Regular season

Results summary

Results by round

Matches
The league fixtures were announced on 8 June 2021.

Play-Off II

Results summary

Results by round

Matches

Belgian Cup

Statistics

Goalscorers

References

K.V. Mechelen seasons
Mechelen